7-a-side football at the 2014 Asian Para Games were held in Namdong Asiad Rugby Field, Incheon from 19 – 23 October 2014. There was 1 gold medals in this sport.

Participating teams and officials

Qualifying
A total of four teams will qualify to compete in the football five a side competition. The host nation (South Korea) automatically qualifies a team. A team may consist of a maximum of 14 athletes.

Squads
The individual teams contact following football gamblers on to:

Venues
The venues to be used for the World Championships were located in Incheon.

Format

The first round, or group stage, was a competition between the 4 teams in one group, where engaged in a round-robin tournament within itself. In both of the best placed, they play in the final for the tournament, the two last teams play for third place.

Classification
Athletes with a physical disability competed. The athlete's disability was caused by a non-progressive brain damage that affects motor control, such as cerebral palsy, traumatic brain injury or stroke. Athletes must be ambulant.

Players were classified by level of disability.
C5: Athletes with difficulties when walking and running, but not in standing or when kicking the ball.
C6: Athletes with control and co-ordination problems of their upper limbs, especially when running.
C7: Athletes with hemiplegia.
C8: Athletes with minimal disability; must meet eligibility criteria and have an impairment that has impact on the sport of football.

Teams must field at least one class C5 or C6 player at all times. No more than two players of class C8 are permitted to play at the same time.

Group stage
In the first group stage have seen the teams in a one group of four teams.

Finals

Bronze-medal match

Gold-medal match

Statistics

Ranking

Goalscorers
6 goals

3 goals

2 goals

1 goal

See also

Football 7-a-side at the 2016 Summer Paralympics

References

External links
Competition Summary from December, 14th, 2014
Cerebral Palsy International Sports & Recreation Association (CPISRA)
International Federation of Cerebral Palsy Football (IFCPF)

2014
2014 in Asian football
football
2014
2014–15 in Iranian football
2014 in South Korean football
2014 in Singaporean football
2014 in Japanese football